Summit is an unincorporated community in Blount County, Alabama, United States.

Alabama is home to a wealth of caves; northeast Alabama is considered a cave "hotspot" in the United States because of its many caves and the number of animals inhabiting those environments. This area contains approximately two-thirds of the state's caves, but numerous other parts of the state possess the geology necessary for cave formation—beds of carbonate rock.

Summit, along with its many caves, is the setting of O. Henry's short-story "The Ransom of Red Chief"

References

Unincorporated communities in Blount County, Alabama
Unincorporated communities in Alabama